The 21 July Martyr's Day Rally is an annual mass rally organized by the All India Trinamool Congress to commemorate the 1993 Kolkata firing as Martys' Day.

It is in remembrance of 13 people shot by the West Bengal Police in Kolkata, during a rally by the West Bengal Youth Congress under Mamata Bandopadhyay on 21 July 1993, while demanding Voter's Identity Card  to be made sole required document for voting.

Background 

In months preceding the events, the 14-year-old communist government won a massive mandate in 1991, but after Mamata Bandopadhyay became the president of youth wing of the opposition INC a new wave of protests began against what many believed  Scientific Rigging employed by the.

In October 1992, Banerjee, now a Minister for Sports and Youth Affairs in the Narsimha Rao ministry held a massive rally at the Brigade Parade Ground to symbolically toll the bell for ousting  of the Communist  Government. To many this rejuvenated the  opposition to Ruling Communists after a long gap.

In December 1992, Banerjee took a physically challenged Girl Felani Basak, who was allegedly raped by CPI(M) cadres to the Writers' Building to the then Chief Minister Jyoti Basu but was harassed and allegedly molested by the police before being arrested and released from detention in midnight, this attracted  universal outrage.

Finally the youth wing  of the party led by  Mamata Banerjee, Pankaj Banerjee, Madan Mitra decided to march to Writers' Building to lodge appeals for Voter Photo-ID cards to be made necessary for free and fair polling....

Events that day 

It was 21 July 1993. The day of Writers' Abhijan organised by the Youth Congress. The demand was: voters' ID cards be made the only required document for voting, to put a stop to CPM's "scientific rigging".

Thousands of Youth Congress supporters had gathered at five different points of the city, recalled Trinamool Congress leader Saugata Roy.

A large number of Youth Congress supporters who had assembled at Howrah station, were marching along Brabourne Road. A strong police contingent stopped them near the Tea Board office —a stone's throw from Writers'. As the crowd tried to break the police cordon, a lathicharge ensued. Stones were thrown, tear gas shells were burst. The crowd retreated, but did not disperse. They took shelter in the narrower roads and lanes between the Tea Board and the
Canning Street crossings. Lathi-wielding policemen entered the lanes to chase them away.

Suddenly a policeman emerged from one of the lanes, bleeding profusely from the head — his white uniform smeared in blood. He had evidently been hit by a stone in the head. Seeing him in that condition, the cops went berserk. By that time, state Youth Congress president Mamata Banerjee had reached the Tea Board crossing, accompanied by a few other leaders. She had climbed onto a traffic post in the middle of the road, in an effort to control the crowd. The angry policemen surrounded the traffic post and started a lathicharge. The Youth Congress leaders accompanying Mamata threw a protective ring around her. Some of them — including Saugata Roy — were badly beaten up.

It had been planned that supporters would move towards Writers' Buildings from different directions and lay a siege on the state secretariat. Mamata had, in the meantime, demonstrated her crowd-pulling ability by holding a successful Youth Congress rally at the Brigade Parade Ground. But the chief minister Jyoti Basu had already announced that he would not allow the state secretariat to be taken over by the YC brigade.

But as planned by the YC, rallies were heading towards Writers' from different directions — from Brabourne Road, from BB Ganguly Street, from Mission Row. One procession was approaching from Mayo Road, where gatherings are prohibited under Section 144. It was stopped by police at the crossing of Mayo Road and Red Road. A scuffle ensued. A few people started throwing stones. Police resorted to lathicharge. The crowd started running across Curzon Park and the battle spread. Afraid that they would be outnumbered, policemen opened fire. Thirteen people were shot dead.

"Mamata herself was beaten up. She collapsed on the road. We rushed her to hospital. More than 200 youths were injured," said Saugata Roy.

21 July rally history 1998-present 

After the main organizers of the 1993 rally broke away to form All India Trinamool Congress the mantle of the rally was taken by AITMC.  2009 and 2010 events drew 2-3 million people each. in 2011 the count was close to 3.5 million.

References 

date=March 2011
History of Kolkata
Political history of West Bengal